Staňkovice may refer to places in the Czech Republic:

Staňkovice (Kutná Hora District), a municipality and village in the Central Bohemian Region
Staňkovice (Litoměřice District), a municipality and village in the Ústí nad Labem Region
Staňkovice (Louny District), a municipality and village in the Ústí nad Labem Region